Orekhovo may refer to:

 List of localities in Russia named Orekhovo
Orekhovo (Moscow Metro), a station on the Zamoskvoretskaya Line of the Moscow Metro
KS Orekhovo, a Russian football team

See also
Orekhovo-Borisovo Severnoye District, a district of Southern Administrative Okrug of Moscow, Russia
Orekhovo-Borisovo Metochion, a metochion of the Patriarch of Moscow
Orekhovo-Borisovo Yuzhnoye District, a district of Southern Administrative Okrug of Moscow, Russia
Orekhovo-Zuyevo, a city in Moscow Oblast, Russia
Orekhovo, Pokrovsky Uyezd, Vladimir Governorate, an historic village which was merged into Orekhovo-Zuyevo in 1917